Tierra caliente is an informal term used in Latin America to refer to places with a distinctly tropical climate. These are usually regions from sea level from 0–3,000 feet.
The Peruvian geographer Javier Pulgar Vidal used the altitude of 1,000 m as the border between the tropical rain forest and the subtropical cloud forest (Yunga fluvial).

Most tierra caliente regions are along coastal plains, but some interior basin regions also fit the label. Agriculture in those areas is dominated tropical crops, such as bananas and sugar cane.

See also 

 Köppen climate classification
 Altitudinal zonation
 Tierra templada, ecoregion border: 2,500 ft or 1,000 m (Javier Pulgar Vidal)
 Tierra fría, ecoregion border, 6,000 ft or 2,300 m (Javier Pulgar Vidal)
 Tierra helada, ecoregion border, treeline: 12,000 ft or 3,500 m (Javier Pulgar Vidal)

Literature 

Altitudinal life zones of Peru
Climate of South America
Geography of Mesoamerica
Spanish words and phrases
Geography of South America